Tetrahydroharman(e), also known as 1-methyl-1,2,3,4-tetrahydro-β-carboline, is a general name for one of two isomers:
 (1S)-1-methyl-2,3,4,9-tetrahydro-1H-pyrido[3,4-b]indole
 Calligonine ((1R)-1-methyl-2,3,4,9-tetrahydro-1H-pyrido[3,4-b]indole)

Calligonine is a major alkaloid constituent of the roots of Calligonum minimum and the bark of Elaeagnus angustifolia. When taken internally, it has the effect of substantially lowering blood pressure for an extended period of time, similar to reserpine.

References
 Landolt-Börnstein

See also
Peganum harmala
Harmala alkaloid

Tryptamine alkaloids
beta-Carbolines